Ab Qaleh may refer to:
 Ab Qaleh, Khuzestan
 Ab Qaleh, alternate name of Darreh Qaleh, Khuzestan Province
 Ab Qaleh, Razavi Khorasan